South Carolina Highway 53 (SC 53) is a  state highway in the U.S. state of South Carolina. The highway connects Shiloh with rural areas of Sumter County.

Route description
SC 53 begins at an intersection with US 378 (Myrtle Beach Highway) southwest of Shiloh, within Sumter County. It travels to the northeast, through rural areas of the county, and curves to a nearly due east direction. It intersects SC 58 (Pleasant Grove Road), and the two highways begin a concurrency. They have an interchange with Interstate 95 (I-95), where they enter Shiloh. Approximately  later, SC 53 splits off to the south, onto Pudding Swamp Road. SC 53 continues through rural areas of the county to an intersection with SC 341 (Mt. Zion Road). About  later is the highway's northern terminus, an intersection with SC 403 (Lynches River Road/Amwell Church Road). This is southwest of the Lynches River.

Major intersections

Hobbs Crossroads alternate route

South Carolina Highway 53 Alternate (SC 53 Alt.) was an alternate route that existed partially in Hobbs Crossroads. In May 1938, it was established from SC 341 south-southwest of the community, north-northeast to SC 53 and SC 309 in the community, then west-northwest and northwest back to SC 341. In 1947, it was decommissioned. Today, it is known as Amwell Church Road and Lynches River Road.

See also

References

External links

SC 53 at Virginia Highways' South Carolina Highways Annex
Former SC 53 ALT at Virginia Highways' South Carolina Highways Annex

053
Transportation in Sumter County, South Carolina